The 2015–16 Colorado State Rams men's basketball team represented Colorado State University during the 2015–16 NCAA Division I men's basketball season. The team was coached by Larry Eustachy in his fourth season. They played their home games at the Moby Arena on Colorado State University's main campus in Fort Collins, Colorado and were members of the Mountain West Conference. They finished the season 18–16, 8–10 in Mountain West play to finish in a tie for sixth place. They defeated San Jose State and Boise State to advance to the semifinals of the Mountain West tournament where they lost to Fresno State. They did not participate in a postseason tournament.

Previous season
The Rams finished the season 27–7, 13–5 in Mountain West play to finish in third place. They advanced to the semifinals of the Mountain West tournament where they lost to San Diego State. They were invited to the National Invitation Tournament where they lost in the first round to South Dakota State.

Departures

Incoming Transfers

2015 Recruiting Class

2016 Recruiting Class

Roster

Schedule

|-
!colspan=9 style="background:#00674E; color:#FFC44F;"| Exhibition

|-
!colspan=9 style="background:#00674E; color:#FFC44F;"| Non-conference regular season

|-
!colspan=9 style="background:#00674E;"| Mountain West regular season

|-
!colspan=9 style="background:#00674E;"| Mountain West tournament

References 

Colorado State
Colorado State Rams men's basketball seasons
Colorado State Rams
Colorado State Rams